Pinguiochrysidaceae is a family of marine Heterokontophyta. It is the only family in the order Pinguiochrysidales, which is the only order in the class Pinguiophyceae. It includes five species of unicellular organisms with high concentration of polyunsaturated fatty acids in the cytoplasm. The other common features are the lack of cell wall and the tendency for flagella loss even on the stage of zoospore, which is unusual for heterokonts. One species (Polypodochrysis teissieri) inhabits benthic substates (sometimes found the mucilage of other algae) and is able to produce lorica with one or more tubular necks. The other species live in the plankton.

Species
 Class Pinguiophyceae
 Order Pinguiochrysidales Kawachi et al., 2002
 Family Pinguiochrysidaceae Kawachi et al., 2002
 Genus Glossomastix O’Kelly, 2002
 Species Glossomastix chrysoplasta O’Kelly, 2002
 Genus Phaeomonas Honda & Inouye, 2002
 Species Phaeomonas parva Honda & Inouye, 2002
 Genus Pinguiochrysis Kawachi, Atsumi, Ikemoto & Miyachi, 2002
 Species Pinguiochrysis pyriformis Kawachi, Atsumi, Ikemoto & Miyachi, 2002
 Species Pinguiochrysis rumoiana Kato & Masuda 2003
 Genus Pinguiococcus Andersen, Potter & Bailey, 2002
 Species Pinguiococcus pyrenoidosus Andersen, Potter & Bailey, 2002
 Genus Polypodochrysis Magne, 1975
 Species Polypodochrysis teissieri Magne, 1975

References

Ochrophyta
Heterokont families